Lilly Christine Irani is an American academic whose research spans topics in computer science, communication studies, feminist studies, entrepreneurship, and microwork. She is an associate professor in the Department of Communication at the University of California, San Diego.

Education and career
Irani graduated in 2004 from Stanford University with both a bachelor's degree in the Science, Technology, and Society program and a master's degree in computer science, specializing in human-computer interaction. After working in user interface design at Google from 2003 to 2007, she returned to graduate school, completing a Ph.D. in informatics at the University of California, Irvine in 2013. Her dissertation, Designing Citizens in Transnational India, was supervised by Paul Dourish.

She joined the University of California, San Diego faculty as an assistant professor of communications in 2013, and was tenured as an associate professor in 2019.

Selected publications
Irani is the author of the book Chasing Innovation: Making Entrepreneurial Citizens in Modern India (Princeton University Press, 2019), which won the 2019 Diana Forsythe Prize for Science, Technology, Engineering, or Medicine of the American Anthropological Association as well as the 2020 Outstanding Book Award of the International Communication Association. She is also the coauthor, with Jesse Marx, of the book Redacted (Taller California Books, 2021).

Her journal and conference papers include:

References

External links
Home page

Year of birth missing (living people)
Living people
American computer scientists
American women computer scientists
American social scientists
American women social scientists
Communication scholars
Stanford University alumni
University of California, Irvine alumni
University of California, San Diego faculty
21st-century American women